Margie Stewart (December 14, 1919 – April 26, 2012) was the official United States Army poster girl during World War II. She appeared on twelve posters, of which a total of 94 million copies were distributed.

She was born in Wabash, Indiana and attended Indiana University. She became a model and appeared in about 20 RKO movies, often in uncredited roles. Among her roles was that of Marjorie Forrester, Throckmorton P. Gildersleeve's niece, in Gildersleeve's Ghost.

In addition to appearing in the posters, Stewart toured the U.S. as one of the four members of a group called the Bondbardiers, accompanied by various Hollywood stars, to sell war bonds. In 1945, she toured Europe and was one of the first civilians to enter Germany after the end of the war. Her appearance in London's Hyde Park "caused gridlock."

Modeling
Described as "the U.S. military's official pinup" during World War II, Stewart worked as a model for posters to boost the morale of men in the United States armed forces during that war. A 1943 news brief noted, "Though she quit as a poster model to become a movie starlet ... Margie Stewart will ... appear on two special posters to be circulated by the army among overseas troops -- for morale effect." In 1944, Stewart was described in a photo caption as "credited with being the favorite poster girl of men in the U.S. Army." She also posed for posters on the home front, "promoting everything from war bonds to security."

She once estimated that more than 94 million of her posters were distributed worldwide during the war.

Later life
Stewart and her husband lived in Studio City, California, and produced concerts at the Hollywood Bowl. She also did volunteer work at the Ronald Reagan UCLA Medical Center.

Personal life
In 1945, she married Jerry Jeroske, an army captain. The Jeroskes later changed their last name to Johnson. They had one child, Stephen, and three grandchildren. Jerry Johnson died in 2003.

Death
Stewart died of pneumonia on April 26, 2012, at a hospital in Burbank, California.

Filmography

References

External links

1919 births
2012 deaths
Actresses from Indiana
American film actresses
Deaths from pneumonia in California
Female models from Indiana
Indiana University alumni
People from Studio City, Los Angeles
People from Wabash, Indiana
21st-century American women